This is a select bibliography of post World War II English language books (including translations) and journal articles about the Russia during the First World War, the period leading up to the war, and the immediate aftermath. For works on the Russian Revolution, please see Bibliography of the Russian Revolution and Civil War. Book entries may have references to reviews published in English language academic journals or major newspapers when these could be considered helpful.

Additional bibliographies can be found in many of the book-length works listed below; see Further Reading for several book and chapter length bibliographies. The External Links section contains entries for publicly available select bibliographies from universities.

A limited number of English translations of significant primary sources are included along with references to larger archival collections. 

Inclusion criteria
Works included are referenced in the notes or bibliographies of scholarly secondary sources or journals. Included works should either be published by an academic or widely distributed publisher, be authored by a notable subject matter expert as shown by scholarly reviews and have significant scholarly journal reviews about the work. To keep the bibliography length manageable, only items that clearly meet the criteria should be included.

Citation style
This bibliography uses APA style citations. Entries do not use templates. References to reviews and notes for entries do use citation templates. Where books which are only partially related to Russian history are listed, the titles for chapters or sections should be indicated if possible, meaningful, and not excessive.

If a work has been translated into English, the translator should be included and a footnote with appropriate bibliographic information for the original language version should be included.

When listing works with titles or names published with alternative English spellings, the form used in the latest published version should be used and the version and relevant bibliographic information noted if it previously was published or reviewed under a different title.

General History of World War I

 Emmerson, C. (2019). Crucible: The Long End of the Great War and the Birth of a New World, 1917-1924. New York: PublicAffairs.
 Hart, P. (2013). The Great War: A Combat History of the First World War. New York: Oxford University Press.
 Keegan, J. (2000). The First World War. New York: Vintage.
 Leonhard, J. & Camiller, P. (2018). Pandora's Box: A History of the First World War. Cambridge, MA: Harvard University Press.
 Goldstein, E. (2013). The First World War Peace Settlements, 1919-1925. London: Routledge.
  Meyer, G. J. (2006). A World Undone: The Story of the Great War 1914 to 1918. Random House.
 Stevenson, D. (2005). Cataclysm: The First World War as Political Tragedy. New York: Basic Books.

General History of Russia and World War I
 Gatrell, P. (2015). Tsarist Russia at War: The View from Above, 1914–February 1917. The Journal of Modern History, 87(3), 668–700.

Background
 Clark, C. M. (2013). The Sleepwalkers: How Europe Went to War in 1914. New York, NY: Harper.
 Dowler, W. (2010). Russia in 1913. DeKalb: DeKalb: Northern Illinois University Press.
 Emmerson, C. (2013). 1913: In Search of the World Before the Great War. New York: PublicAffairs.
 Lieven, D. (1983). Russia and the Origins of the First World War. London, UK: Palgrave Macmillan.
 ———. (2016). The End of Tsarist Russia: The March to World War I and Revolution. New York: Penguin Books.
 McMeekin, S. (2013). The Russian Origins of the First World War. Cambridge, MA: Harvard University Press.

Domestic Russian History
 Bushnell, J. (2017). Russian Peasants and Soldiers during World War I: Home and Front Interacting. Russian Studies in History, 56(2), pp. 65–72.
 Gatrell, P. (1999). A Whole Empire Walking: Refugees in Russia during World War I. Bloomington: Indiana University Press.
 Gatrell, P. (2005). Russia’s First World War: A Social and Economic History. Harlow, UK: Pearson-Longman.
 Kenez, P. (1972). Changes in the Social Composition of the Officer Corps during World War I. The Russian Review, 31(4), pp. 369–375.
 Lohr, E. (2003). Nationalizing the Russian Empire: The Campaign Against Enemy Aliens During World War I. Cambridge, MA: Harvard University Press.
 Sanborn, J. A. (2005). Unsettling the Empire: Violent Migrations and Social Disaster in Russia during World War I. The Journal of Modern History, 77(2), pp. 290–324. 
 Sanborn, J. A. (2003). Drafting the Russian Nation: Military Conscription, Total War, and Mass Politics, 1905–1925. DeKalb, IL: Northern Illinois University Press.

The Russian Empire
 Reynolds, M. A. (2011). Shattering Empires: The Clash and Collapse of the Ottoman and Russian Empires 1908–1918. Cambridge, UK: Cambridge University Press.
 Smele, J. (2016). The “Russian” Civil Wars, 1916-1926: Ten Years That Shook the World. New York, NY: Oxford University Press.
 Staliūnas, D., & Aoshima, Y., (eds.). (2021). The Tsar, the Empire, and the Nation: Dilemmas of Nationalization in Russia's Western Borderlands, 1905–1915. Historical Studies in Eastern Europe and Eurasia. Budapest: Central European University Press.
 Steinberg, J. W. (2014). Imperial Apocalypse: The Great War and the Destruction of the Russian Empire. New York, NY: Oxford University Press.
 Zygar, M. (2017). The Empire Must Die: Russia’s Revolutionary Collapse, 1900-1917. New York, NY: PublicAffairs.

Related to the Russian Revolution

 Buzinkai, D. (1967). The Bolsheviks, the League of Nations and the Paris Peace Conference, 1919. Soviet Studies, 19(2), pp. 257–263. 
 Engelstein, L. (2017). Russia in Flames: War, Revolution, Civil War, 1914-1921. New York, NY: Oxford University Press.
 Heenan, L. E. (1987). Russian Democracy's Fatal Blunder: The Summer Offensive of 1917. New York, NY: Praeger.
 Krammer, A. (1983). Soviet Propaganda among German and Austro-Hungarian Prisoners of War in Russia, 1917–1921. In Richardson, S. R. & Pastor, P (Eds.). Essays on World War I: Origins and Prisoners of War. (pp. 249–64). New York, NY: Brooklyn College Press, 1983.
 Lieven, D. (2016). The End of Tsarist Russia: The March to World War I and Revolution. New York, NY: Penguin Books.
 Lincoln, W. B. (1986). Passage Through Armageddon: The Russians in War and Revolution, 1914-1918. New York, NY: Simon and Schuster.
 Morrison, A., Drieu, C., & Chokobaeva, A. (Eds.). (2020). The Central Asian Revolt of 1916: A Collapsing Empire in the Age of War and Revolution. Manchester: Manchester University Press.
 Nation, R. C. (2009). War on War: Lenin, the Zimmerwald Left, and the Origins of Communist Internationalism. Chicago, IL: Haymarket Books.
 Read, C. (2013). War and Revolution in Russia, 1914–22. London, UK: Macmillan.
 Smith, S. A. (2017). Russia in Revolution: An Empire in Crisis, 1890 to 1928. New York, NY: Oxford University Press.

Military History

 Buttar, P. (2014). Collision of Empires: The War on the Eastern Front in 1914. Oxford: Osprey Publishing.
 ——— (2017). Germany Ascendant: The Eastern Front 1915. Oxford: Osprey Publishing.
 ——— (2017). Russia's Last Gasp: The Eastern Front 1916–17. Oxford: Osprey Publishing.
 ——— (2019). The Splintered Empires: The Eastern Front 1917–21. Oxford: Osprey Publishing.
 Dowling, T. C. (2009). The Brusilov Offensive. Bloomington, IN: Indiana University Press.
 Marshall, A. (2004). Russian Military Intelligence, 1905–1917: The Untold Story behind Tsarist Russia in the First World War. War in History, 11(4), pp. 393–423.
 Neiberg, M. S. & Jordan, D. (2012). The Eastern Front 1914-1920: From Tannenberg to the Russo-Polish War. London, UK: Amber Books.
 Sanborn, J. A. (2003). Drafting the Russian Nation: Military Conscription, Total War, and Mass Politics, 1905–1925. DeKalb, IL: Northern Illinois University Press.
 Steinberg, J. W. (2010). All the Tsar's Men: Russia's General Staff and the Fate of Empire, 1898-1914. Baltimore, MD: Johns Hopkins University Press.
 Stoff, L. S. (2006). They Fought for the Motherland: Russia's Women Soldiers in World War I and the Revolution. Lawrence, KS: University Press of Kansas.
 Stone, D. R. (2015). The Russian Army in the Great War: The Eastern Front, 1914-1917. Lawrence, KS: University Press of Kansas.
 Stone, N. (1998). The Eastern Front, 1914–1917. New York, NY: Penguin Books.
 Wildman, A. K. (1980, 1987). The End of the Russian Imperial Army (2 vols.). Princeton, NJ: Princeton University Press.

Topical

Industry and labor
 Engel, B. A. (1997). Not by Bread Alone: Subsistence Riots in Russia during World War I. The Journal of Modern History, 69(4), 696–721. 
 Siegelbaum, L. H. (1978). Moscow Industrialists and the War-Industries Committees During World War I. Russian History, 5(1), 64–83.

Agriculture and the peasantry
 Seregny, S. J. (2000). Peasants, Nation, and Local Government in Wartime Russia. Slavic Review, 59(2), 336–342.
 Seregny, S. J. (2000). Zemstvos, Peasants, and Citizenship: The Russian Adult Education Movement and World War I. Slavic Review, 59(2), 290–315.

Other works
 David-Fox, M., Holquist, P., & Martin, A. M. (2012). Fascination and Enmity: Russia and Germany as entangled histories, 1914-1945. Pittsburgh, PA: University of Pittsburgh Press.
 Hartley, J. M. (2021). Chapter 13:The Volga in War, Revolution and Civil War. In The Volga: A History. New Haven: Yale University Press.
 Pschichholz, C. (Ed.). (2020). The First World War as a Caesura? Demographic Concepts, Population Policy, and Genocide in the Late Ottoman, Russian, and Habsburg Spheres. Berlin: Duncker and Humblot.

Historiography and memory studies
 Kobiałka, D., Kostyrko, M., & Kajda, K. (2017). The Great War and Its Landscapes Between Memory and Oblivion: The Case of Prisoners of War Camps in Tuchola and Czersk, Poland. International Journal of Historical Archaeology, 21(1), 134–151.

Further reading
Many of the above works contain bibliographies. Included below are a selection of works with large bibliographies related to Russian history.
 Engelstein, L. (2017). Russia in Flames: War, Revolution, Civil War, 1914-1921. New York, NY: Oxford University Press.
 Smele, J. (2016). The “Russian” Civil Wars, 1916-1926: Ten Years That Shook the World. New York, NY: Oxford University Press.

See also
 Bibliography of the Russian Revolution and Civil War

References

Notes

Citations

External links
 Russia and World War I: Bibliography of Secondary Sources, Institute for Historical Research.
 Pennington, R. (2012). Russian Military History. Oxford, UK: Oxford University Press. 

 
Russia during World War I
Russian Empire in World War I